Alberto Morales (born 27 April 1948) is a Mexican boxer. He competed in the men's light flyweight event at the 1968 Summer Olympics.

References

External links
 

1948 births
Living people
Mexican male boxers
Olympic boxers of Mexico
Boxers at the 1968 Summer Olympics
Sportspeople from Acapulco
Light-flyweight boxers
Boxers from Guerrero